Michael Fenton (30 October 1913 – 5 February 2003) was an England international footballer for Middlesbrough either side of World War II. A forward, he scored 162 goals in 269 appearances in all competitions.

Early and personal life
Michael Fenton was born on 30 October 1913 in Portrack, Stockton-on-Tees, County Durham. He married Alfreda Davies in 1937. He ran a newsagents in the Roseworth shopping area of Stockton-on-Tees in the 1950s and 1960s.

Club career
Fenton started his professional career with Middlesbrough in 1932, having previously played football with Portrack Shamrocks (Stockton) and South Bank East (Middlesbrough). He made his debut in 1933, gradually replacing George Camsell as Boro's leading goalscorer. Camsell was top scorer for ten consecutive seasons, though the club would soon become equally reliant on Fenton's goals. The Ayresome Park club struggled in the lower half of the First Division table in the 1933–34, 1934–35, and 1935–36 campaigns. Fenton scored 22 goals in 1936–37, to become the club's top-scorer, as "Boro" rose to seventh place. He then hit 26 goals in 1937–38 and 35 goals in 1938–39 as the club posted top five finishes. the Football League was suspended due to World War II. During the war he continued to score goals for Middlesbrough, and also guested for Port Vale, Notts County, Rochdale, Wolverhampton Wanderers and Blackpool. After the war, despite being wanted by Everton, Fenton returned to Teesside, where he continued his scoring record, ending as top goalscorer for the next four seasons. He scored 23 goals in 1946–47 (level with Wilf Mannion), 29 goals in 1947–48 and 12 goals in 1948–49. However David Jack's "Boro" failed to break into the top ten. His retirement came at the end of the 1949–50 season, at which point he joined the back-room staff. He scored a total of 162 goals in 269 league and FA Cup appearances, leaving him fifth in the club's all-time goalscoring charts. He remained on the staff until 1966. He has a corporate lounge named after him at the Riverside Stadium.

International career
Fenton gained his one and only England cap on 9 April 1938 in a 1–0 defeat to Scotland at Wembley.

Career statistics
Source:

Honours
England
British Home Championship: 1937–38

References

1913 births
2003 deaths
Footballers from Stockton-on-Tees
Footballers from County Durham
English footballers
England international footballers
England wartime international footballers
Association football forwards
Middlesbrough F.C. players
Port Vale F.C. wartime guest players
Notts County F.C. wartime guest players
Rochdale A.F.C. wartime guest players
Wolverhampton Wanderers F.C. wartime guest players
Blackpool F.C. wartime guest players
English Football League players
Association football coaches
Middlesbrough F.C. non-playing staff